229 Adelinda is a large, dark outer main-belt asteroid. It was discovered by Austrian astronomer Johann Palisa on August 22, 1882, in Vienna, and was named after Adelinda, the wife of fellow Austrian astronomer Edmund Weiss.

This object is classified as a C-type asteroid and is probably composed of primitive carbonaceous material. 229 Adelinda is part of the Cybele asteroid group and probably in 4:7 orbital resonance with planet Jupiter.

References

External links
The Asteroid Orbital Elements Database
Minor Planet Discovery Circumstances
Asteroid Lightcurve Data File
 

Cybele asteroids
Adelinda
Adelinda
BCU-type asteroids (Tholen)
18820822

vec:Lista de asteroidi#229 Adełinda